Matsuyama City General Community Center is an arena in Matsuyama, Ehime, Japan. It is the home arena of the Ehime Orange Vikings of the B.League, Japan's professional basketball league.

References

Basketball venues in Japan
Ehime Orange Vikings
Indoor arenas in Japan
Sports venues in Ehime Prefecture
Matsuyama, Ehime
Sports venues completed in 1987
1987 establishments in Japan